Gotovlje is a settlement in the Municipality of Žalec in east-central Slovenia. The A1 motorway crosses the territory of the settlement north of the village core. The area is part of the traditional region of Styria. The municipality is now included in the Savinja Statistical Region.

The parish church in the settlement is dedicated to Saint George and belongs to the Roman Catholic Diocese of Celje. It is a Gothic building that was restyled in the Baroque in the mid-18th century. The belfry dates to 1907. A second church belonging to the same parish stands in the hills north of the settlement. It is dedicated to Saint Gertrude and dates to the first half of the 16th century.

References

External links

Gotovlje at Geopedia

Populated places in the Municipality of Žalec